Pick Up a Bone is the first album by Rupert Hine, released in 1971. Pick Up a Bone was the only album by Hine that he did not produce himself.

Reception
In its obituary of Hine, The Guardian wrote that "listeners remained un-stirred by [the album's] somewhat gauche folk-rock."

Track listing 
All compositions by Rupert Hine (music) & David MacIver (lyrics), except "Pick up a Bone" (music by Rupert Hine & Simon Jeffes).
"Landscape"
"Ass All"
"Me You Mine"
"Scarecrow"
"Kerosene"
"Running Away"
"Medicine Munday"
"More Than One, Less Than Five"
"Boo Boo's Faux Pas"
"Pick Up a Bone"
"Intense Muse"

Personnel 
All rhythm track arrangements:
 Paul Buckmaster
Orchestral arrangements
 Paul Buckmaster (3,4,5 & 8)
 Peter Robinson (2 & 7)
 Del Newman (1)
Saxophone arrangement
 Simon Jeffes (9)
Director of the Orchestra
 David Katz
Rhythm section
 Rupert Hine — Vocals, Guitar, Harmonica 
 Simon Jeffes — Acoustic, Electric & Slide Guitars 
 David MacIver — Guitar 
 Peter Robinson — Piano, Organ 
 Pete Morgan — Acoustic & Electric Bass 
 Terry Cox — Drums
Featured Musicians
 Clive Hicks, Eric Ford & Joe Moretti — Guitars 
 Steve Hammond — Electric Guitar & Banjo 
 Paul Buckmaster — Electric Cello 
 Eddie Mordue & Roy Willox — Saxophone, Flute 
 Raul Mayora — Congas, Bells & etc.
 Roger Glover — Tambourine 
 Barry de Sousa — Drums & introducing—The MacIver-Hine Chorale

References

1971 debut albums
Rupert Hine albums
Albums produced by Rupert Hine
Purple Records albums
Capitol Records albums